Craig Reid (born 26 February 1986) is a Scottish footballer who plays as an either a right back or centre-back for Hurlford United.

Early life
Craig attended Ardrossan Academy.

Club career

Celtic
Reid started his career as a youth player with Celtic from 2002 until 2007 but never made a first team appearance, after signing from Ardrossan boys club TASS Thistle. Celtic loaned him out to Stirling Albion during the first half of the 2007–08 season to gain some first team experience. Reid played in 13 league matches during his time at Forthbank Stadium.

Queen of the South
Reid signed for Dumfries side Queen of the South in the January 2008 transfer window. Queens progressed to the 2008 Scottish Cup Final, but Reid was unable to play because he was cup-tied having played for Stirling Albion in a previous round of the competition. Reid played for the Palmerston club in both legs of the Uefa Cup Qualifiers against Danish side FC Nordsjælland.

Reid established himself in the first team of the Palmerston Park side during the 2009–10 season. He signed a new two-year contract extension with Queens on 23 April 2010.
 Reid's first senior goal was the opener in the Challenge Cup semi final 2–1 win away at Peterhead on Saturday 9 October 2010 when he lashed home a loose ball inside the box.

On 23 April 2011, before the home match versus Cowdenbeath, Davie Rae presented Reid with a trophy in recognition of his century of appearances for the first team. Reid, however, did not complete the match due to receiving a red card.

Greenock Morton
On 16 July 2012, Reid signed for Greenock Morton on a one-year deal. HIs contract expired in May 2013. Reid played as a trialist on 24 July 2013 for Coventry City as they lost 2–0 to Fleetwood Town. On 18 October 2013, Reid re-signed for Morton until January 2014. He left the club upon expiry of his contract.

Motherwell
After training with the club during pre-season, Reid signed for Motherwell until the end of the season, on 21 February 2014. Reid made a major contribution by scoring the winning goal, in injury time, of the final fixture of the season to secure second place ahead of rivals Aberdeen. On 28 May 2014, he signed a new two-year contract with the club. In October 2015, Reid signed an emergency three-month loan with St Mirren. He returned to Motherwell at the end of his loan on 2 January 2016.

Dunfermline Athletic
On 1 February 2016, Reid left Motherwell by mutual consent, signing the following day for Scottish League One side Dunfermline Athletic until the end of the 2015–16 season. Reid briefly played with and worked under Pars manager Allan Johnston whilst at Queen of the South. After achieving promotion to the Scottish Championship, Reid was released at the end of the 2015–16 season having made 12 appearances for Dunfermline.

Keflavík
In July 2016, Reid signed for Iceland First Division side Keflavík, becoming the club's third Scottish signing of the 2016 season after Marc McAusland. and Stuart Carswell also joined the club. Reid left Keflavík at the end of the 2016 season after his contract with the club was not renewed.

Return to Scotland
Reid returned to Scotland in March 2017, signing for Scottish League One side Peterhead until the end of the 2016–17 season. Following the team's relegation to Scottish League Two, Reid was released by the club. Reid subsequently signed for Ayr United in June 2017. He helped them to a promotion in 2017–18, but was released at the end of the season.

International career
Reid played at under-17, under-18 and under-19 level for Scotland.

Career statistics

Honours

Club
Celtic
Scottish Youth Cup: Winner (2)
Scottish Youth League: Winner (3)
Scottish Reserve League: Winner (4)

Dunfermline Athletic
Scottish League One: 2015–16

Ayr United
Scottish League One: 2017-18

East Kilbride
Lowland League: 2018–19
SFA South Region Challenge Cup: 2018–19

Kelty Hearts
Lowland League: 2019–20, 2020–21

Darvel
West of Scotland Football League Premier Division: 2021-22

Individual
Greenock Morton
MSC Player of the Year: 2012–13

Queen of the South
Player of the Year: 2010–11
Young Player of the Year: 2009–10

References

External links

 (Peterhead)

Morton Careers Stats at FitbaStats

1986 births
Living people
Footballers from Irvine, North Ayrshire
Scottish footballers
Celtic F.C. players
Darvel F.C. players
Stirling Albion F.C. players
Queen of the South F.C. players
Scottish Football League players
Association football defenders
Greenock Morton F.C. players
Motherwell F.C. players
St Mirren F.C. players
Dunfermline Athletic F.C. players
Knattspyrnudeild Keflavík players
Peterhead F.C. players
Ayr United F.C. players
Scotland youth international footballers
Scottish Professional Football League players
East Kilbride F.C. players
Kelty Hearts F.C. players
Lowland Football League players
Stenhousemuir F.C. players
West of Scotland Football League players
Hurlford United F.C. players